Muriel Cerf (4 June 1950 – 19 May 2012) was a French novelist and travel writer.

Her first book, L'Antivoyage, was inspired by her travels in Southeast Asia, and was a major critical success.  She was awarded the Prix Littéraire Valery Larbaud in 1975 for Le Diable vert.

Selected works
L'Antivoyage (1974)
Le Diable vert (1975)
Marie Tiefenthaler (1982)
Julia M. ou le Premier Regard (1991)
La Petite Culotte (2005)

References

Sources
 France, Peter (Ed.) (1995). The New Oxford Companion to Literature in French. Oxford: Clarendon Press.  .

1950 births
2012 deaths
Writers from Paris
20th-century French novelists
21st-century French novelists
French travel writers
École du Louvre alumni
20th-century French women writers
Prix Valery Larbaud winners
Chevaliers of the Ordre des Arts et des Lettres
21st-century French women writers
Women travel writers